Ryszard Ronczewski (27 June 1930 – 17 October 2020) was a Polish actor.

He appeared in more than seventy films from 1954 to 2021 (the premiere of The Wedding occurred a few months after his death).

Ronczewski died from COVID-19 on 17 October 2020, during the COVID-19 pandemic in Poland. He was 90.

Selected filmography

References

External links 
 

1930 births
2020 deaths
Deaths from the COVID-19 pandemic in Poland
Polish male film actors
Polish male stage actors
Polish male television actors
Male actors from Vilnius
People from Wilno Voivodeship (1926–1939)